This is a list of Italian constituencies from 1946 to present. For the election of the Italian Chamber of Deputies, since 1993 Italy is divided in 27 districts called circoscrizioni. However, the distribution of seats being calculated at national level, districts serve only to choose the single candidates inside the party lists. During the election of the Italian Senate, according to the Constitution, each Region is a single district, without connections at national level.

During the Regional elections, the districts correspond to the Provinces, even if some seats are allocated at regional level. For the Provincial elections, a special system is used, based on localized lists: even if the competition is disputed on provincial level, candidates are presented in single-member districts, and their final position inside each party list depends by the percentage of votes they received in their own districts. Finally, for the Communal elections no districts are used.

Electoral districts for the Chamber of Deputies from 1946 to 1994

Aosta

Turin–Novara–Vercelli

Cuneo–Alessandria–Asti

Genoa–Imperia–La Spezia–Savona

Milan–Pavia

Como–Sondrio–Varese

Brescia–Bergamo

Mantova–Cremona

Trento–Bolzano

Verona–Padova–Vicenza–Rovigo

Venezia–Treviso

Udine–Belluno–Gorizia–Pordenone

Trieste

Bologna–Ferrara–Ravenna–Forlì

Parma–Modena–Piacenza–Reggio Emilia

Florence–Pistoia

Pisa–Livorno–Lucca–Massa Carrara

Siena–Arezzo–Grosseto

Ancona–Pesaro–Macerata–Ascoli Piceno

Perugia–Terni–Rieti

Rome–Viterbo–Latina–Frosinone

L'Aquila–Pescara–Chieti–Teramo

Campobasso–Isernia

Naples–Caserta

Benevento–Avellino–Salerno

Bari–Foggia

Lecce–Brindisi–Taranto

Potenza–Matera

Catanzaro–Cosenza–Reggio Calabria

Catania–Messina–Siracusa–Ragusa–Enna

Palermo–Trapani–Agrigento–Caltanissetta

Cagliari–Sassari–Nuoro–Oristano

References

Elections in Italy
Chamber of Deputies (Italy)
Italy